The East Is Red, also known as The East Is Red: A Song and Dance Epic, is a 1965 Chinese film directed by Wang Ping, based on an opera production (assembled by Zhou Enlai). It is an abridged history of the Chinese Revolution and the Chinese Communist Party (CCP) under the leadership of Mao Zedong, from the beginnings of the May Fourth Movement, to the Civil War against the Nationalist Party, and to the victory of the Communists and the founding of the People's Republic of China (PRC). The film is commercially available today on both CD and video, as well as online with English subtitles.

Background and inspiration
In 1960, the Senior General of the People's Liberation Army General Staff Department (GSD) Luo Peiqing visited North Korea, along with air force commander Liu Yalou. During their visit to DPRK, the Korean side performed a large-scale song and dance "Three Thousand Miles of Mountains and Rivers", whose content was largely adapted from songs and dances during the war period. On their way back to China, Shenyang military area command also held a party and performed four revolutionary songs.

After coming back to China, Liu Yalou had the idea of making a revolution-related artistic work by using the popular revolutionary songs among the public, which he thought could encourage the public during the difficult three-year period. By the end of 1960, the Air Political and Cultural Troupe sent songwriters including Zhang Shixie, Zhu Jianyuan, Yao Xuecheng, Chen Jie, etc. to collect and integrate the revolutionary songs. After the intense creation, the script named The Glorious History was made and given to Liu Yalou. Later, suggested by Niu Chang, they renamed it "Revolutionary History Songs Singing" and started to show it to the audiences.

To celebrate the 15th anniversary of the liberation of Shanghai in May 1964, the literary and art circles performed a large-scale musical concert - "Singing Forward under the Banner of Mao Zedong" - in the Cultural Square, under the guidance of the Shanghai Municipal Party Committee. The content of this musical concert represented the revolution of the new Chinese government and the success of the new Chinese socialism. After Zhou Enlai saw "Revolutionary History Songs Singing" and "Singing Forward under the Banner of Mao Zedong", he realized the potential of converting the stage performance into a national commemoration of the CCP to show the Chinese citizens the glorious journey from the founding of the party to the founding of the PRC during the 15th anniversary of the National Day.

On July 30, 1964, Zhou convened the relevant officials at a meeting in Xi Hua Hall, Zhong Nan Hai, and made the final decision about launching the epical musical concert project, and this concert was named as "The East Is Red" during the meeting. Zhou pointed out that the core concept of this concert should be closely related to the summarized concept, the establishment of the communist party, armed struggle, and the uniting of the nation. On October 2, 1964, The East is Red was performed for the first time in the Great Hall of the People in Beijing on the 15th anniversary of the National day.

Plot
The East Is Red depicts the history of the Chinese Communist Party under Mao Zedong from its founding in July 1921 to the establishment of "New China" in 1949. Detailed in the musical are several key events in CCP history such as the Northern Expedition (taken up by the Kuomintang (KMT) National Revolutionary Army with Chinese Communist and Soviet support), the KMT-led Shanghai massacre of 1927, the Nanchang Uprising and the formation of the People's Liberation Army, the Long March, guerrilla warfare of the PLA during the Second United Front (during the War of Resistance Against Japanese Aggression), the subsequent overthrow of the National Government of the Republic of China on Mainland China by the PLA in the decisive phase of the Chinese Civil War, and the founding of the People's Republic on October 1, 1949.

The East Is Red is divided into the following named stages: The prelude "Sunflowers Face the Sun", followed by "Dawn of the East", "A Spark Ignites a Prairie Fire", "Ten Thousand Crags and Torrents", "Beacon of Anti-Japanese Resistance", "Bury the Chiang Family Dynasty", and "The Chinese People Have Stood Up". Two additional scenes from the end of the play, "The Motherland Moves Forward" and "The World Moves Forward", were omitted from the film adaptation during filming under Mao's suggestion.

Historical context
It was during the Great Chinese Famine when Liu Yalou decided to make this work. From 1959 to 1961, at least 15 million of the Chinese population died because of starvation contributed by policies of the Great Leap Forward and People's commune, as well as natural disasters. The East Is Red was previously a peasant love song, and soon became a call to arms in the Anti-Japanese War. This song was also a paean extolling Mao. It was written in the early 1930s as a folk song that was popular among the farmers of Shanxi, a village near the communist base of Yan'an. In 1938, the song was reworded in order to provoke people in the fight against the Japanese invaders. After the rise of Mao as the leader of the Chinese Communist Party in the early 1940s, the song was reworked again by a teacher and became a key feature of Yan'an life. "The East is red, the sun has risen. Mao Zedong has appeared in China. He is devoted to people's welfare, Hu-er-hai-yo, He is the people's great savior."

The East Is Red was published the year before the Cultural Revolution, therefore, this film was not only a visually stunning artistic performance for Chinese audiences at the time, but also a historical ending for the past 17 years of art history.

Film adaptation
Not long after its premiere, Zhou had the idea of turning the stage performance into a film adaptation. In December 1965, Zhou Enlai invited the film artists of the National People's Congress and the Chinese People's Political Consultative Conference (CPPCC), as well as members of the director group of The East is Red, to the Great Hall of the People to hold a symposium on film shooting.

At the meeting, Jiang Qing disagreed with the film production and expressed her own opinion: "I am very worried about turning this large-scale music and dance epic into a film, because The East is Red is not cohesive and coherent enough, the artistic effect is flat, and the revolutionary optimism is not prominent enough."

Despite this, he proceeded with his decision and three movie companies came together to film it. Wang Ping, co-director Li Enjie, and August First Film Studio. Principal cinematography finished on September 18, 1965. The film was released on National Day of 1965.The East is Red is seen as a film adaptation of the stage performance, though the two are not identical. The original play's six main sections depicting the history of the Communist Party remained while some scenes were cut. The film was released on October 2, 1965.

Relation to the Cultural Revolution 
With its vital political importance, The East Is Red revealed the prototype of the stylization, dogmatism, and the worship of Mao Zedong in the Cultural Revolution during its creation process. According to the published articles by the main producers of The East Is Red, including Chen Yading, An Bo, etc., individuals who took responsibility for drafting the basic format of the epic had to learn about Mao's works first and use Maoism as a red line of the project to determine what should be underscored. Also, the songwriters, scriptwriters, and choreographers referred to and were inspired by Mao's thoughts to produce their pieces of work for The East Is Red. Even performers of the epic made efforts to form the knowledge of Maoism during the rehearsals, and they hung up quotations from Mao at rehearsal venues. Thus, as scholar Shuang Chen argues, The East Is Red was affected heavily by the politicized circumstance in which it was produced, and foreshadowed the Cultural Revolution, namely the social and political turmoil that lasted for a decade since 1966.

Soundtrack 
 Orchestra, ensemble and choirs - Overture: "The East is Red" (with dance)
 Orchestra, ensemble and choirs - "Northern October Winds"
 Orchestra, ensemble and choirs - "Over The Snowy Meadows"
 Orchestra, ensemble and choirs - "Workers, Peasants and Soldiers, Unite!"
 Orchestra, ensemble, choirs and lady duettists - "(For the Red Army) Wooden Hunan Shoes"
 Orchestra, ensemble, and male choir - "Three Rules of Discipline and Eight Points for Attention" (Adaptation of the military anthem of China)
 Orchestra, ensemble and choirs - "Looking At The North Star"
 Orchestra, ensemble and choirs - "Crossing the Dadu River" (with dance)
 Orchestra, ensemble and lady soloist - "Song of the Yi People"
 Orchestra, ensemble and male choir - "The Armies Have Reunited (Long Live the Red Army)"
 Orchestra, ensemble, choirs and male soloist - "Long March"
 Orchestra, ensemble and soloists - "Along the Songhua River" (Ballad of the Northeasters)
 Orchestra and ensemble- "March of the Volunteers" (1st performance)
 Orchestra, ensemble and choir - "Song of the Military and Political University of Resistance Against Japan"
 Orchestra, ensemble and choir - "Song of Guerrillas"
 Orchestra, ensemble, ladies choir and soloist - "Nanniwan"
 Orchestra, ensemble and choirs - "Defend the Yellow River" from the Yellow River Cantata
 Orchestra, ensemble and choirs - "Unity is Power"
 Orchestra, ensemble and male choir - Military Anthem of the People's Liberation Army
 Orchestra, ensemble, choirs and duettists- "The Occupation of Nanjing by the Chinese People's Liberation Army" (One of Chairman Mao's poems)
 Orchestra and ensemble - "March of the Volunteers" (2nd performance) (National Anthem of the People's Republic of China, played at the beginning of Act 6, in the Tiananmen Square scene)
 Orchestra, ensemble and choirs - "Without the Communist Party, There Would Be No New China"
 Orchestra, ensemble, and male soloist - Paean
 Orchestra, ensemble, ladies choir and soloists - "Song of Liberated Tibetan Serfs"
 Orchestra, ensemble and choirs - Finale: "Ode to the Motherland"
 Orchestra, ensemble, choirs and audience - "The Internationale" (Words by Eugène Pottier, music by Pierre Degeyter, Chinese translation by Qu Qiubai) Only the first verse is sung at the finale scene.

In the film, these songs are accompanied and punctuated by exaggerated acting and dancing, resembling that of the displays of silent era films. Such acting incorporates acts of violence such as the whipping of laborers by suit wearing, blonde haired, Western capitalists and their Chinese friends. It is interesting that many scenes involve dancing girls pointing AK-47's. The songs and dances incorporated within the film convey raw revolutionary passion behind each song within the soundtrack.

Another important aspect of the sound in The East is Red is the voice over narration. Between each scene the narration describes the Chinese people's difficulties during each scene's time period, which helps uneducated spectators understand the film more easily.

Singers featured in the film include Wang Kun, Tseten Dolma, Hu Songhua and Guo Lanying.

Analysis

Composition
The East is Red, performed by little egret folk dance troupes, Department of Chinese folk dance, Beijing Dance Academy, is a representative work of group dance. In the beginning, the actors connect points and points, points and lines, and points and surfaces, which increases the level sense of dance in space. From 42 seconds part of the dance began to transform into a triangle, the neat dance and background music perfectly combined to create a tense atmosphere. The 1:04 part of the duet is to use the relationship between "point" and "face", to highlight the main body by arranging the position of the main body reasonably. From the perspective of plane space, the composition is a variety of figures formed by dancers. In order to reveal the theme and express abstract art, different "forms" have different functions. At 2:40, different points (high, low, front, and back) are designed to form a line. The connection between the weak area and the strong area creates a new image that is emphasized. It presents a magnificent historical scene in the plane space so that the audience can enjoy different characters.

Depiction of women 
Wang Ping, considered the first female director of the PRC period, produced and directed the film, establishing the female socialist authorship. Although there are more actors than actresses in the film, the women's image shows a more significant diversity than men's perceptions. There are three major types of women in general: armed women in the marching armies, tender women who prepare food and clothes for the military, and dancing girls who celebrate the victory of the army and party. In contrast, the male image seems to be singular and stereotypical - they are brave fighters. Moreover, some essential roles focus on kinships like mothers and daughters, while there is no image of fathers.

Image of ethnic minorities
The East is Red was the first occurrence of Han Chinese and ethnic minorities in China dancing together on the same stage. Many ethnic minorities are depicted happily singing and dancing, and are shown interacting with the PLA and CCP leaders, as shown in the meeting between Tseten Dolma and Zhou Enlai. For more than 40 years since then, the image of ethnic minorities has been defined by an image of harmony and characterized by displays of cultural artistry, such as the national costumes and dance depicted in the production, without much change. The expression of the image of China's ethnic minorities is closely linked with the expression of the image of the country. The state considers ethnic minorities be an integral part of China, and the unity and harmony of all ethnic groups have become the basis of the image of the country. Despite this narrative of ethnic unity, minority ethnic groups have come into conflict with the state.

Integration of national culture
The East is Red contains more than 30 songs in just over two hours, and many of these have been adapted from folk songs, reflecting the unity of all Chinese ethnic groups, but it is not a simple retro. For example, "Deep Feelings" is adapted from the folk tune of the Yi nationality, the song of the Yueqin. After being adapted into "Deep Love", there are not only the singing styles of folk songs but also the lyrics and revolutionary history. The integration of ethnic minority culture, Han culture, and revolutionary red culture awaken people's expectations and yearning for a better life enriches people's spiritual life and makes up for the lack of material life. For example, the lyrics of "Millions of Serfs Stand Up" can reflect the ethnic minority's abhorrence of the backward and miserable days and yearning for a new life. In the prelude "Sunflowers Face the Sun", the sunflower motif represents Chinese people of all ethnic groups, with Mao Zedong as the sun. This overall tone has specific political implications. Almost all the lyrics and recitation words have the keywords of red and black, new and old, light and dark, forming sharp contrasts.

Brief explanation of the six stages
The first stage, "Dawn of the East", starts with a long dance segment depicting the "Years of Suffering" preceding the PRC from subjugation under foreign influences and social divide, showing the different kinds of sufferings experienced by the people. This stage features characters with distinctive personalities such as dockers, white-haired elders, and foreign invaders but it also borrows the folktale "River and River (江河水)" from the soundtrack. The melodies of the people are used to enhance the atmosphere as well as to fully express the reality of their miserable livelihoods. The last song of the stage "Workers, Peasants and Soldiers, Unite! (工农兵联合起来)" represents the unity of the oppressed people standing together to overthrow oppression.

The second stage, "A Spark Ignites a Prairie Fire" has four parts. The first part is the performance of "The Righteous Song (就义歌)". Through the tragic and vigorous tone of the Western orchestral music and the leading vocals of the tenor, it has a more intense effect against the background of the chorus. It has become a prominent message-bearing song in the history of music. The music and dance techniques adopted have also become a paradigm. "Autumn Harvest Uprising" is the main part of the show. By increasing the number of torches on the stage, it symbolizes the uprising and continuous efforts of the revolutionary team. "Meeting at Mount Jinggang" is a performance composed of three songs, in which the duet of female voice "Pairs of Straw Sandals for the Red Army (双双草鞋送红军)" adopts the technique of double voice polyphony to give the front section the characteristics of Jiangxi folk songs. The second half reflects the united atmosphere of military and civilian and with the song "Three Rules of Discipline and Eight Points for Attention (三大纪律八项注意)" the communist party expresses the primary reason for their support from many civilians. "Fighting Against the Local Tyrants and Dividing the Land" describes the people's dissatisfaction and complaints against their enemies.

The third stage "Ten Thousand Crags and Torrents" highlights the Chinese Red Army of workers and peasants as they pass the time while trekking the difficult journey of the 9,000 km Long March through singing and dancing. The songs used in the song and dance programs, such as "Long March", "Over Snow Mountain and Grass (过雪山草地)", represents the hard journey of the Red Army and the efforts they had made in order to achieve liberation. The singing was carried out in a way that the tenor and the chorus matched each other, highlighting Mao Zedong's wisdom as well as the courage and strength of the Red Army.

The fourth stage "Beacon of Anti-Japanese Resistance" shows the plight of the Chinese people's tenacious resistance to Japanese aggression since the Mukden Incident, which consists of five parts. "Along the Songhua River (松花江上)" sets up the stage as it represents the fall of the northeast. This also indicates the opening of the Anti-Japanese War with a guerrilla song that uses rhythmic drums to represent the tension of that time. The performance, "Mass Production" uses songs "Nanniwan (南泥湾)", "Coming in February" and "Ten Songs in the Border Area" from the Yan'an mass production movement. This performance bears the message that the communist party not only can come together to fight for their country but also can support the people by their own labor with the mass production movement.

The fifth stage "Bury the Chiang Family Dynasty" is composed of four sections. Following the victory of the Second Sino-Japanese War, Chiang Kai Shek launched a civil war with the support of American imperialism against the Communists, which brought heavy disaster to the Chinese people. Among them, the songs "Unity is Power (团结就是力量)" and "Not Afraid to Go to Jail (坐牢算什么)" show that the Communist Party of China has vowed to come together and defend the oppressed people of China. "March Dance" and "A Million Heroes Crossing the River" express the party's quick and powerful victory over the Kuomintang through dance. The song "The Sky Above the Liberated Zone (解放区的天)" celebrates the victory of the Communist army and represented the long-awaited liberation of the people of China. "The Occupation of Nanjing by the Chinese People's Liberation Army (人民解放军占领南京)" puts a successful end to the fifth performance.

The sixth stage, "The Chinese People Have Stood Up" is the last, and is the sublimation of the whole scene. The stage is introduced with the singing of the national anthem "March of the Volunteers (义勇军进行曲)". Through the song "Without the Communist Party, There Would Be No New China (没有共产党就没有新中国)" Chinese people show their love and gratitude for Mao Zedong. Starting with the song "Ode (赞歌)" and "Chairman Mao, I Wish You a Long Life (毛主席，祝你万寿无疆)" by Hu Songhua, a minority singer, and Tseten Dolma, and many performances by minority groups follow to represent the unity of the people of China and their love for the new leader and new China. After that, the following segments, "Ode to the Motherland (歌唱祖国)" and "The Internationale (国际歌)" further praise the achievements of victory displayed previously. The stage concludes with all Chinese people including the previously oppressed resisting the fascist colonial rule and the imperialist aggression and colonial activities as well as welcoming together a new era.

Related artworks

Song-and-Dance Epic and Film The Laud for the Chinese Revolution 
The Laud for the Chinese Revolution (simplified Chinese: 中国革命之歌; traditional Chinese: 中國革命之歌; pinyin: zhōngguó gémìng zhī gē), a 1984 Chinese film directed by the People's Liberation Army (PLA) Movie Studio (namely the August First Film Studio), depicts the history of China, particularly under the leadership of the Chinese Communist Party, from 1840 (the Opium War) to 1984 to celebrate the 35th anniversary of the People's Republic of China.

This film is considered the second grand song-and-dance epic of the PRC with the support of the central government, following The East Is Red and keeping the musical and dancing mode of performance set up by it. Despite the modified representation of the more recent modernization of China, the historical narrative regarding the history of the CCP in The Laud for the Chinese Revolution was presented in great imitation of that part in The East Is Red.

The Laud for the Chinese Revolution was accomplished with the participation of more than 1,300 performers from 68 theatres nationwide who were called for the mission. Nevertheless, as there were still many political issues and debates regarding Mao Zedong, the Cultural Revolution, the past of the CCP and the future of China among the society in 1984, compared to The East Is Red, The Laud for the Chinese Revolution had a much smaller scale and much less attention from the public.

Song-and-Dance Epic and Film Road to Revival 
Road to Revival (simplified Chinese: 复兴之路; traditional Chinese: 復興之路; pinyin: fùxīng zhī lù), produced by the Propaganda Department of the Central Committee of the Communist Party of China, the Ministry of Culture, the Chinese National Broadcasting Bureau, Political Headquarters of the People's Liberation Army and the Beijing City Government, is a 2009 Chinese film created with strong political significance for the celebration of the 60th anniversary of the PRC. It gathered more than 3,200 artists from theatres around the country. Road to Revival's first audience included all top CCP and central government leaders at the time of its release, such as Hu Jintao and Wen Jiabao, and other members of the Political Bureau of the CCP Central Committee.

Same as The East Is Red and The Laud for the Chinese Revolution, Road to Revival, the third grand song-and-dance epic in the PRC's history, serves to promote the official ideology implemented by the government by glorifying the CCP's history and eulogizing the country's achievements under the leadership of the party. Similarly, Road to Revival portrays the history of China from the collapse of the Qing Dynasty to 2009, following the conventions and the basic format of the previous two song-and-dance epics. Meanwhile, instead of emphasizing the histories of the party and modern China before 1949 as in the two former epics, Road to Revival focuses more on the depiction of China's post-1949 period. Specifically, as its topic indicates, Road to Revival presents the histories of the CPP and China as a process of questing the revival of the nation as a whole, rather than primarily a realization of the party's goal of revolution that is showcased in The East Is Red and The Laud for the Chinese Revolution.

Photography Project "The East Was Red" 
Photographer Sheila Zhao made a project named "The East Was Red". She got her inspiration from the film The East is Red and examined the power and prevalence of political messaging in photography from that time. Zhao collected old photos which were taken when Mao Zedong was highly praised by the Chinese people. She replaced all the revolutionary or political-related content with the color red—the color represents the party and that period of time. According to Zhao, her aim was "to focus one's attention on the impact a political agenda can have on the everyday lives of a population and how much it altered the vernacular visual language of China's history."

Further reading 

 Huang, Weixing; Meng, Zhaoxiang. (October 2010). "Zhou Enlai through the Eyes of a Military Artist: An Interview based on the Large-scale Song-and-Dance Epic The East Is Red (一位军队艺术家眼中的周总理——基于大型音乐舞蹈史诗《东方红》的一次访谈)". Journal of PLA Academy of Art. (4): 36–38. 
 Arne Westad, O. (2012). Restless Empire: China and the World Since 1750. Basic Books. 
 Xiao, Z., & Zhang, Y. (2002). Encyclopedia of Chinese Film. Routledge.
 Schaller, M. (2016). The United States and China (4th ed.). Oxford University Press.

External links 

The Laud for the Chinese Revolution (1984) on YouTube
Road to Revival (2009) on YouTube with simplified Chinese subtitles

References

 
 

1965 films
Chinese propaganda films
1960s Mandarin-language films
Tibetan-language films
1960s musical films
Maoist China propaganda films
Cultural depictions of Mao Zedong
Anti-fascist propaganda films